"Desde Cuándo" (English: "Since When") is a song by Spanish singer-songwriter Alejandro Sanz. The song serves as second single for Sanz's eighth studio album Paraíso Express (2009). It was released airplay through Warner Music Latina on January 11, 2010 and digitally on January 18, 2010.

Music video
 
A music video for the song was filmed in December 2009. It was filmed in Golden Oak Ranch studios from Disney on Los Angeles, Cal. It was directed by Pedro Castro who also directed the video for "Looking for Paradise" alongside British Phil Griffin.

It also stars American actress Eva Longoria as Sanz's love interest. The video is set in a field environment with a river where Sanz and Longoria  ride bicycles, sleep together and have a romantic and conspiratorial attitude at all times. Speaking about the video Longoria said "I really like Alejandro's music. He is very talented and it was an honour to be able to work with him" while Sanz said "Working with Eva is a pleasure, she is a great friend with whom I have a lot in common, she is easy to connect to and as an actress she helped me make the video more credible." The music video was premiered on December 23, 2009.

Charts

Certifications

References

2010 singles
2009 songs
Alejandro Sanz songs
2000s ballads
Pop ballads
Songs written by Alejandro Sanz
Songs written by Tommy Torres
Warner Music Latina singles